Dyson School or The Dyson School can refer to:

United Kingdom 
 Dyson Institute of Engineering and Technology, a private undergraduate institute in Malmesbury, Wiltshire
 Dyson School of Design Engineering, an engineering department at Imperial College London

United States 
 Charles H. Dyson School of Applied Economics and Management, a school of Cornell University